The 1865 Ohio gubernatorial election was held on October 10, 1865. National Union nominee Jacob Dolson Cox defeated Democratic nominee George W. Morgan with 53.53% of the vote.

General election

Candidates
Jacob Dolson Cox, National Union
George W. Morgan, Democratic

Results

References

1865
Ohio